The Pacific Zen Institute (PZI), is a Zen Buddhist practice center in Santa Rosa, California. Established in 1999, its stated mission is to "create a culture of transformation through meditation, koans, conversation, and the arts." It's founding director is John Tarrant, who developed ways of teaching koans that can orient anyone, including people with little or no experience in meditation or Zen, toward awakening and a rich, full engagement with their own lives. PZI has a number of affiliate centers in the lineage of John Tarrant, a dharma heir of Robert Baker Aitken, and formerly of the Sanbo Kyodan school of Zen.

Students and teachers at PZI work with Zen koan as the primary tool for transforming the mind and finding freedom. According to the PZI website:

The Pacific Zen Institute offers multi-day retreats in several California locations including Santa Rosa, California, and Bolinas, California as well as one-day workshops in the San Francisco, Santa Rosa, Oakland and Berkeley areas.

Affiliates
 Santa Rosa Creek Zen Center (in Santa Rosa, CA)
The Rockridge Meditation Community (in Oakland, California)
San Francisco Wind-In-Grass Sangha (in San Francisco)
Santa Barbara Group (in Santa Barbara, California)

Bluegrass Zen (based in Waco, KY with groups in Lexington and Berea)
Desert Lotus Zen Sangha (in Chandler, AZ)

Tarrant's biography

James Ishmael Ford says of Tarrant,

John Tarrant (born 1949) is a Western Zen teacher who explores koans as a way to discover freedom and unexpected openings. Tarrant is the founder and director of the Pacific Zen Institute (PZI). The Institue has large centers in California, Arizona, Kentucky, and New York, as well as "small groups" in many states throughout America. Tarrant teaches and writes about the transformation of consciousness through the use of the Zen koan and trains koan meditation teachers. Tarrant grew up in the City of Launceston on Bass Strait, in the state of Tasmania.

Tarrant was born in Australia and came from an old Tasmanian family. He was influenced early in his life by English literature, especially poetry, the Latin Tridentine Mass, the Tasmanian bush, and Australian Aboriginal culture. Tarrant worked at many jobs, ranging from laboring in an open-pit mine, to commercial fishing the Great Barrier Reef. Eventually he also worked as a lobbyist for the Australian Aboriginal land rights movement. Tarrant attended the University of Tasmania and then the Australian National University, where he earned a degree in Human Sciences and English Literature. He later earned a Ph.D. in Psychology from Saybrook Institute in San Francisco. He wrote his doctoral thesis on "The Design of Enlightenment in Koan Zen" and for twenty years was a Jungian psychotherapist working on dream analysis at the same time as he developed his teaching of koans.

Tarrant's first Buddhist studies, in the early 1970s, were with Tibetan Lamas who visited Australia. He discovered koans (stories sometimes given to Zen practitioners to hasten and refine insight and enlightenment) and, lacking any teachers in the Southern Hemisphere, worked on them by himself for a number of years. Later in the United States he passed his first koans with Korean teacher Seung Sahn. He studied with Robert Baker Aitken in Hawaii for 9 years and was Aitken’s first dharma heir. He also did advanced koan work with Koun Yamada. He began teaching in 1983. In 1987 he founded the organization that evolved into the Pacific Zen Institute (PZI) in Santa Rosa, California, devoted to koan work and the arts.

As reported in Tricycle: The Buddhist Review, a Buddhist quarterly, Aitken later "disowned John Tarrant for what Aitken considered credible allegations of sexual indiscretions with students, and also criticized Tarrant's teaching style and conduct as a therapist." Following a meeting of a subset of the Diamond Sangha Teachers' Circle (DSTC) in Hawaii, eleven teachers signed a letter commenting on the separation of Tarrant from the Diamond Sangha. The PZI asserted that the break was also due in part to Tarrant's experimental and unorthodox approach to koan work and differences in the two organization's visions of Western Zen.

Tarrant has contributed to The Paris Review, Threepenny Review and the books Beneath a Single Moon: Buddhism in Contemporary American Poetry and What Book? Buddha Poems From Beat to Hiphop. Tarrant's own books include The Light Inside the Dark: Zen Soul & The Spiritual Life (HarperCollins)—a map of the spiritual journey including the dark bits—and Bring Me the Rhinoceros—& Other Zen Koans To Bring You Joy (Harmony), which is a sampler of koans and a western approach to them.

Although his training was originally in what was essentially still the ancient Chinese koan system, Tarrant has spent many years exploring how koans can be pertinent to people living in the modern world. He holds koan seminars where people of all levels of experience are welcomed and a collaborative culture is encouraged. Pacific Zen Institute’s program of Koan small groups and salons allow people to study koans together in an ongoing way. He teaches koans as doorways available to anyone, not only for advanced practitioners.

PZI’s projects include creating new English translations of some of the elements of the sutra collection as well the evolution of musical settings of many parts of the chanted liturgy. Working with the Zen teacher and translator, Joan Sutherland, and Richie Domingue, then leader of the Zydeco Band “Gator Beat”, Tarrant collaborated in developing what is probably the first sung Zen liturgy in an American idiom.

Among Tarrant’s successors and collaborators through Pacific Zen Institute include the Zen master Joan Sutherland, head of the "Open Source" Zen network, Susan Murphy, a film maker and Zen master based in Sydney, Australia, David Weinstein in Northern California, James Ishmael Ford, founder and senior teacher of the "Boundless Way Zen" network., Allison Atwill, a teacher and artist originally from Santa Barbara, Jon Joseph, a former financial analyst from San Mateo, and David Parks, a former Chrisitan minister now living in Waco, Kentucky.

As part of his interest in meditation in action Tarrant has taught in alternative energy corporations and medical and health care organizations. He worked with the startup of Dr. Andrew Weil’s Fellowship in Integrative Medicine at the University of Arizona, Tucson. Tarrant designed and taught the part of the curriculum in which the art of medicine was approached as being based in the arts of attention including working with the executive team at Duke Integrative Medicine with Dr. Tracy Gaudet.

Tarrant's lineage
Tarrant has appointed several teachers, some of whom have also appointed teachers:
Atwill, Allison, Roshi
 Barzaghi, Subhana Gyo Shin, Myo-Un-An Roshi (born 1954); also received Transmission from Robert Aitken
 Bolleter, Ross Roshi (born 1946); also appointed by Robert Aitken
Boughton, Rachel, Roshi
 James Ishmael Ford (born 1948); also a Soto teacher appointed by Jiyu Kennett Roshi
 Blacker, Melissa Keido Myozen Roshi (born 1954)
Joseph, Jon, Roshi
 Grant, Steven, Roshi (born 1962)
Gaudry, Guy, Roshi
 Ross, Lanny Sevan Keido Sei'an Sensei (born 1951); also holds the Dharma Transmission in the Philip Kapleau lineage
 Mansfield-Howlett, Rachel, Roshi, at Santa Rosa City Zen, US
 Murphy, Susan Myo Sei Ryu'un An Roshi (born 1950); also received Transmission from Ross Bolleter
Parks, Rev. David, Roshi
 Saint, Deborah, Sensei
 Sutherland, Joan Roshi (born 1954)
 Bender, Sarah Masland Sensei (born 1948)
 Palmer, Andrew Sensei (born 1971)
 Nathanson, Tenney Sensei (born 1946)
 Terragno, Danièl Ki-Nay (born 1947), Roshi
 Parekh, Antoinette Kenjo Shin (born 1959), apprentice teacher
 Twentyman, Craig, Independent teacher
 Weinstein, David Onryu Ko'un, (born 1949) Roshi

See also
Buddhism in the United States
Timeline of Zen Buddhism in the United States

Footnotes

Notes

References

Zen centers in California
Culture of Santa Rosa, California
Religious buildings and structures in Sonoma County, California
Buddhism in California
1999 establishments in California
Religious organizations established in 1999
Buddhism in the San Francisco Bay Area